Our Feature Presentation is a 2008 independent comedy film directed by Gardner Loulan and written by Gardner Loulan and Joseph Brady.

Production
Our Feature Presentation is a low-budget independent film.  Cast and crew include many professionals and volunteers.  The director is Gardner Loulan who is a host for NBC's show 1st Look. During production Gardner was a VJ and writer on the MTV college station, MTVU.  The entire film was cast and shot in 2006 in Palo Alto, California: auditions for cast were held April 28–30; callbacks were on May 13–14; pre-production began May 15; principal filming began June 15 and wrapped on July 15. Post-production was done in New York City and the film had its theatrical premiere in Atherton, California on December 21, 2008.

Plot
Cody Weever (played by Chad Eschman) grew up a child who loved films and yearned to make one with the help of his doting grandfather Alexander Weever (Ron Crawford), a former Hollywood star.  His mother (Diane Tasca), an irascible self-made billionaire, refuses to fund Cody's project, leaving him resentful yet determined. At the same time, and much to his dismay, an unconfirmed rumor begins to spread in Cody's small affluent town of Buck Valley that the beautiful but untalented Hollywood star and salt fortune heiress Jasmine Danell (Christina Rosenberg) wants to star in Cody's film in order to make her current lover and famed French-Canadian director LeStat LeChaton (Craig Lewis), jealous.  The residents of town react to the news by confronting Cody, and one by one lobbying to be a part of the film. His ego and ambition overpower Cody, and he allows the people of the town to distract and corrupt his initial vision.  Jasmine stars in his film, and Cody's brother auctions the directorial role to LeChaton much to Cody's dismay.  Finally, and after significant personal compromise, with his production usurped and his unprofessional cast and crew, Cody attempts to sabotage his set only to realize it has taken on a life of its own.

Partial cast
 Chad Eschman as Cody Weever 
 Ron Crawford as Alexander Weever
 Jeffrey Weissman ...  Hugo Wilmington
 Dustin Diamond as Mr. Renolds
 Erin Cahill as Mrs. Renolds
 Elissa Stebbins as Finny Wong
 Diane Tasca as Helen Weever 
 Craig Lewis as Lestat LeChaton
 Liam Brady as Kenneth Weever 
 Christina Rosenberg as Jasmine Danell
 Maggie VandenBerghe as Sam Biscotti 
 Haley Mancini as Michelle Biscotti 
 Karen Hager as Judy Templeton
 Brandon Alexander as Bobby Roberts

References

External links

Our Feature Presentation official website
Our Feature Presentation at Aunt Colony Productions, LLC
Hollywood Up Close, Our Feature Presentatuion complete cast list
Our Feature Presentation at Film.com
almanacnews.com, The Almanac, March 22 2006, "Friends launch local feature film project"
almanacnews.com,, The Alamanac, June 21 2006, "Short Takes"
Palo Alto Daily News, July 11 2006, "Woodside readies for its closeup"

2008 films
2000s English-language films